Rhizocephalus is a genus of plants in the grass family, Poaceae. The only known species is Rhizocephalus orientalis, native to Afghanistan, Armenia, Georgia, Iran, Iraq, Israel, Jordan, Lebanon, Palestine, Syria, AsiaticTurkey, and Uzbekistan.

References

Pooideae
Monotypic Poaceae genera
Flora of Asia
Taxa named by Pierre Edmond Boissier